Teddy Mézague (born 27 May 1990) is a French professional footballer who plays as a defender for Ararat Yerevan.

Early and personal life
Born in Marseille, Mézague is of Cameroonian descent, and his older brother Valéry played for the Cameroon national team.

Career
Mézague spent his early career in France with Montpellier and FC Martigues. In July 2014 he moved to Belgian club Royal Excel Mouscron, and in August 2016 he moved to English club Leyton Orient. He scored his first and only goal for Leyton Orient against Notts County on 18 February 2017.

On 12 September 2018, Mézague joined Romanian side Dinamo București on a free transfer. After leaving Dinamo in November 2019, he moved to Hapoel Ra'anana in February 2019. In January 2020, Mézague signed a contract with Bulgarian club Beroe Stara Zagora. In June 2021, he signed with Turkish side Eyüpspor, becoming the first foreign player in the club's history.

On 6 March 2023, Ararat Yerevan announced the signing of Mézague.

Career statistics

References

1990 births
Living people
Footballers from Marseille
French sportspeople of Cameroonian descent
French footballers
Association football defenders
Montpellier HSC players
FC Martigues players
Royal Excel Mouscron players
Leyton Orient F.C. players
FC Dinamo București players
Hapoel Ra'anana A.F.C. players
PFC Beroe Stara Zagora players
Eyüpspor footballers
Ligue 1 players
Championnat National players
Championnat National 3 players
Belgian Pro League players
English Football League players
Liga I players
TFF First League players
French expatriate footballers
French expatriate sportspeople in Belgium
Expatriate footballers in Belgium
French expatriate sportspeople in England
Expatriate footballers in England
French expatriate sportspeople in Romania
Expatriate footballers in Romania
French expatriate sportspeople in Israel
Expatriate footballers in Israel
French expatriate sportspeople in Bulgaria
Expatriate footballers in Bulgaria
French expatriate sportspeople in Turkey
Expatriate footballers in Turkey
French expatriate sportspeople in Armenia
Expatriate footballers in Armenia
FC Ararat Yerevan players